Mikhail Mikhailovich Slyadnev (born 19 January 1983) is a former Russian professional football player.

Club career
He played  in the Russian Football National League for FC Oryol in 2006.

References

1983 births
People from Novomoskovsky District
Living people
Russian footballers
Association football defenders
FC Rostov players
FC SKA Rostov-on-Don players
FC Oryol players
FC Sportakademklub Moscow players
FC Spartak-MZhK Ryazan players
Sportspeople from Tula Oblast